William Louis Tozer (July 3, 1882 – February 23, 1955), was a Major League Baseball pitcher who played in  with the Cincinnati Reds. He batted and threw right-handed. Tozer had a 0–0 record, with a 1.69 ERA, in four games, in his one-year career.

He was born in St. Louis, Missouri and died in Belmont, California.

External links

1882 births
1955 deaths
Major League Baseball pitchers
Baseball players from California
Cincinnati Reds players
Butte Miners players
Portland Green Gages players
Salt Lake City Elders players
Los Angeles Angels (minor league) players
Buffalo Bisons (minor league) players
Spokane Indians players
San Francisco Seals (baseball) players